Tiny Toon Adventures: Buster Saves the Day (released as Tiny Toon Adventures in Japan) is the first Tiny Toon Adventures game released on the Nintendo Game Boy Color. It was released on June 30, 2001 in Japan and July 30 in United States and was developed by Warthog and published by Conspiracy Games.

Gameplay
Buster Saves the Day is a side-scrolling platformer where the player controls Buster Bunny as he puts a stop to the bad plans of Montana Max, who has kidnapped the friends of Buster Bunny.  Various characters from the Tiny Toon Adventures cartoon makes an appearance and some of them attempt to stop Buster from saving his friends.  Babs Bunny, Plucky Duck, and Hamton J. Pig are among those that Max has kidnapped.

Various weapons are a part of Buster's arsenal, including magic balls that differ in physics and speed.

External links

2001 video games
Game Boy Color games
Platform games
Video games based on Tiny Toon Adventures
Video games developed in the United Kingdom

Game Boy Color-only games
Conspiracy Entertainment games
Single-player video games